In 2001,  the Autonomous Municipal Government of La Paz, Bolivia, began an awareness program to improve usage and awareness of the crosswalks, or zebra crossings, in the city. The program consists of "urban educators" dressed in one-piece zebra costumes, assisting members of the public in crossing the road.

Background
In 2001, the vial situation in La Paz Bolivia was critical, it began an excessive increase of the automotive fleet and the citizens didn't properly know nor exercised their rights and obligations on the streets. It was then that from the Autonomous Municipal Government from La Paz a Vial Plan was proposed, that looked to order and control the entry and transit of the cars in the city center and to disseminate an awareness campaign aimed at citizens on the main rules of road, like the proper use of the crosswalk or the zebra crossing.

The vision of the municipal management was focused on working directly with the citizens, having in mind that the message of a mass campaign on the traditional mass media would be lost or blurred by the impersonal nature of these media.

The idea was to generate a platform to connect with the people and to take the message in a more direct way, but it had to be creative and not invasive, so that the citizens wouldn’t feel questioned by their habits. The City Hall of La Paz had to reach them in a friendly and innovative way.

The program
To develop the Vial Plan, a group young and creative people had the idea to show the zebra crossing, with a character that would represent a Zebra: a two pieces costume that emulates the animal. In a playful way they could make people notice that there is a space for them to exercise their rights as citizens and to walk safely through the streets. That’s how they realized that there was a great amount of citizens of La Paz that didn’t know there was a zebra crossing or what was it for. For this initiative they invited young people that worked polishing shoes or selling candies on the streets to play this curious character.

This policy of focusing on people's needs and improving the citizen’s behavior, helped to see more clearly the phenomenon that was taking place on the streets. Citizens and drivers did not understand the work of these young people dressed as zebras and sometimes reacted violently. On the other hand, the zebras did not understand their role in the Vial Plan, only felt that they were people doing funny things on the streets.

That is when the training process with the young volunteers that were part of the Zebra Program began in performing arts, body language, theater and alternative techniques of education. From this process, the character of the zebra and its role were born: Urban Educator. The young people understood their reason for being on the streets and began to create their own philosophy based on education with love and respect. The vision thereafter was to improve citizen habits by inspiring people to be their best version.

One of the main lines of this program is to focus public policies on the welfare of citizens and to offer tools, spaces and projects to meet the emotional needs of people. The zebra has become synonymous to living in wellness and generating positive actions in the environment with gratitude, love and respect.

The project has a double sense of benefit to the social and educational. Social, because it gives young people a space for personal growth and development, self-esteem and commitment to their city. And educational, because it offers a real alternative of citizen education based on respect for the other and understand the difference between public space and common space. Looking for harmonious coexistence.

Finally the character is recognized for his educational work in the city and is rewarded by the love of the children who see in them an inspiring character and an example to follow.

Milestones
2001 - Pilot experience accompanying the Vial Plan

The project was born on November 19, 2001 with the figure of a Zebra on 4 legs to attract the attention of the citizens in La Paz, Bolivia. Starting with only 24 young people, the idea was to wear a costume of a zebra to draw attention and start the Vial Plan, making visible the strips of the zebra crossing with a character representing a zebra.

2002 - Organization schedules, places and equipment

The support for the Vial Plan continued, placing the young people in their four-legged zebra costumes consecutively in schedules and places of the city center, but the citizens still didn’t notice the crosswalks.

2003 - Agreement with Arco Iris foundation, beginning of the concept of Urban Educators

The reaction of the citizens, the media, the drivers and the stop agents themselves gave signs that something was happening: the idea was perceived and provoked different reactions, which at first were not very good. Gradually the perception of the citizens of La Paz started to improve, but more importantly, people began to understand that it was necessary to respect many things in the city. At this point, the Autonomous Municipal Government of La Paz made an agreement with the Arco Iris Foundation, which worked on the projects with vulnerable young people like the "Hogar de Niñas Obrajes", "Centro de Adolescentes Trabajadores", "Proyecto Casa de Paso" and "Proyecto Trabajadores", so that children who were part of these projects and were in the process of reinsertion could participate at the Zebras Program of La Paz.

2004 - Entrance to public schools with a message through theater; "Mateo and his zebra" and the zebra is a one-piece costume 

The zebras became known as Urban Educators and this allowed the program to go beyond the streets and teach in other spaces like the schools in the city of La Paz through the theatrical play called "Mateo and his zebra" that showed the changes that could be made through observing and reacting to the difficulties of the city.

The 4-legged zebra became a friendlier character with an individual (two-legged) outfit that was also more appealing to the public.

2005 - Creation of the Directorate of Citizen Culture of the Municipality of La Paz, participation in the festive calendar with education

An important aspect for the development of the Zebras Urban Educators Program was the decision in the Autonomous Municipal Government of La Paz, to carry out the management to create the new Citizen Culture Directorate, at the request of the citizens of La Paz who participated in the cultural dialogue workshops. The task of this Directorate was to develop citizenship education and to find ways to reach people to begin the change of attitudes, doing a work through the participation of the Zebra Project in the different activities of the festive calendar of La Paz.

2006 - Birth of the Donkey "Urban Educator" showing errors

After achieving the development of a friendly image of the Zebra, his antagonist partner, the Donkey was created as an educator who teaches through play and irony. Its function is to show the errors so that people can react and correct them.

2007 - Democratization of the participation of the zebras contributing to self-evaluation

Although the presence of the Zebra unleashed several reactions, it is important to note that it was difficult for citizens to recognize that their behavior had to be corrected in the streets and therefore sometimes had negative reactions to the character, so the Directorate of Citizen Culture proposed a new way of acting, relationships that were fractured and distanced began to feed into a relationship of fellowship. The young Urban Educators, began to express their messages from the cordiality, the respect and the love.

In 2007 the Citizen Culture Strategy was created to work the themes: “La Paz in Order”, “La Paz Safe”, “La Paz Clean and Healthy” and “La Paz without Noise”. In 2011, because of the mega-slip, one more theme was added to the strategy “La Paz Alert” that works the management and prevention of risks. In 2016 the last theme “La Paz Happy” is created, which is transversal to the others.

2008 – Creation of the Zebra Philosophy: putting yourself in other people’s places

After the internal review, it was possible to receive proposals from all the young volunteers, pointing out important aspects and proposals for actions in the street. With simpler ways of reaching people, the Zebras broke away from the stall agent's attitude. The approach was that from the greeting begins everything and regain the "please and thank you" that was completely lost in everyday relationships.

In this way the philosophy of the Zebra was born based on putting itself in other people’s places, to prohibit is not to educate and the most important values are consideration, responsibility and respect.

2009 - Change in the relationship between the Zebras and the people

After verifying that the form was to observe, accompany, care and teach people, the project aimed at conquering the emotion of people to reflect on their attitudes and behaviors in order to change them.

From that moment the Zebras adopted an educative function that was given by the sympathy that managed to wake the Zebra and the great confidence of all. The Zebra Urban Educator became a channel of communication between the citizens and the Municipal Autonomous Government of La Paz.

2010 - Expansion of the Zebras Program to Tarija, Bolivia

In 2010 the Mayor of Tarija visited the city of La Paz and while passing through the center of La Paz he found a Zebra operating at the traffic lights of Cochabamba Street and Av. Mariscal Santa Cruz. After the experience, the Mayor of Tarija requested to the Municipal Autonomous Government of La Paz to export the Program with the same line to his city. This year the Zebras project started in the city of Tarija, Bolivia.

2011 -Expansion in macro districts of La Paz

It was proposed the creation of macro-district teams to serve other sectors of the city and therefore to respond the demands beyond the Municipality.

Requests for visits with zebras to educational units and other organizations were increasing year by year, due to the educational value of the character and the themes that he teaches. For this reason, teams of zebras for the sub-municipalities of four macro districts were formed: Max Paredes, Centro, Cotahuma and the Líder team, generating a greater space of opportunity for young people.

2012 - Zebra educator of children and expansion of the Program to the city of Sucre and creation of the Program of Happiness

"Because children are the present that we must all protect," was the message that began to spread through the Zebras Urban Educators Program, educating with values in the squares of the macrodistricts on Saturdays.

In 2012 began the implementation of the "Zebra Week" which consisted of visiting educational units on Mondays, hospitals on Tuesdays, markets of the city on Wednesday, Thursdays youth spaces and Fridays nursing homes.

2013 - Formation of the Zebras Urban Educators Unit, support to the Municipal School Program of Citizen Culture and start of the communication campaign "Zeta"

In 2013, the project grew into the Zebras Urban Educators Unit of the Citizen Culture Department, which is attached to the Municipal Autonomous Government of La Paz.

The Presence of the Zebras increased in the educational units supporting the Municipal School Program of Citizen Culture that works on the themes of the Citizen Culture Strategy. On the other hand, in this year the “Zeta Campaign” was launched, a miniseries that takes like main character a Zebra that seeks to raise awareness to the citizens of La Paz on the subject of management and prevention of risks - La Paz Alert and the other themes of Culture Citizen.

The "Zebra Urban Educators Program" was registered and approved as intellectual property of the Municipal Autonomous Government of La Paz.

2014 - First Meeting of Urban Educators of Sister Cities and First International Congress of Happiness

In November 2014 the first meeting of Cebras Urban Educators took place between the cities of La Paz, Tarija and Sucre, where workshops were held to review, strengthen and improve the actions of Urban Educators with the point of views of young people.

2015 - Zebras Intangible Cultural Heritage of the Municipality of La Paz and expansion of the program to El Alto

In the year 2015 the Zebras were named Intangible Cultural Heritage of the Municipality of La Paz and above all a La Paz city icon, adopting as a task to strengthen the work for the development of a Citizen Culture with values.

That year, the Zebras Urban Educators started to work in the city of El Alto.

2016 – 15 years of the Program and Prize to the Guangzhou International Award for Urban Innovation in China

In 2016 the Zebras Urban Educators Program, which celebrated 15 years of action, won the Guangzhou International Award for Urban Innovation in China because of the ease of replicability of the project and its dual function: educational and social. On the other hand, they also took the title of the Most Voted City Online.

2017 - International zebras

In 2017, Last Week Tonight with John Oliver presented the Zebras of La Paz highlighting the work they do in the streets and showing that everything is better with a Zebra, thus creating the hashtag #JustAddZebras that became a worldwide trend and a viral phenomenon, publicizing the Zebras Urban Educators Program internationally. In 2020, in collaboration with the United States Postal Service, Oliver released a sheet of stamps which included the zebras among other popular characters presented in the show.

See also

Crossing guard

References

La Paz
Road safety organizations